The second round of the women's points race of the 2008–2009 UCI Track Cycling World Cup Classics took place in Melbourne, Australia on 21 November 2008. 39 athletes participated in the contest.

Competition format
A points race is a race in which all riders start together and the object is to earn points during sprints or to lap the bunch.

The tournament consisted of two qualifying heats of 10 km (40 laps). The top twelve cyclist of each heat advanced to the 20 km final (80 laps).

Schedule
Saturday 21 November
12:00-12:20 Qualifying, heat 1
13:20-12:40 Qualifying, heat 2
19:40-20:10 Final
20:40-20:45 Victory Ceremony

Schedule from Tissottiming.com

Results

Qualifying

Qualifying Heat 1

Results from Tissottiming.com.

Qualifying Heat 2

Results from Tissottiming.com.

Final

Results from Tissottiming.com.

See also
 2008–2009 UCI Track Cycling World Cup Classics – Round 2 – Women's individual pursuit
 2008–2009 UCI Track Cycling World Cup Classics – Round 2 – Women's scratch
 UCI Track Cycling World Cup Classics – Women's points race

References

Round 2 Womens points race
UCI Track Cycling World Cup Classics Round 2 Womens points race
UCI Track Cycling World Cup – Women's points race